Manuel Thurnwald (born 16 July 1998) is an Austrian professional footballer who plays as a full-back for SC Rheindorf Altach.

Club career

Early career
Born in 1998, Thurnwald started his football career with Rapid Wien youth team.

Rapid Wien
In 2016, Thurnwald was called up for Rapid Wien first team. On 6 November 2016, Thurnwald made his senior team debut in Austrian Football Bundesliga against Wolfsberger AC at Allianz Stadion, playing the game as a starter for full-time game by coach Mike Büskens.

Rheindorf Altach
On 22 July 2019, Thurnwald joined Rheindorf Altach on a two-year deal with an option for one further year.

Club career statistics

References

Living people
1998 births
Austrian footballers
Footballers from Vienna
Association football defenders
Austria youth international footballers
SK Rapid Wien players
SC Rheindorf Altach players
Austrian Football Bundesliga players
Austrian Regionalliga players